Hasanabad Rural District is a rural district (dehestan) in the Central District of Ravansar County, Kermanshah Province, Iran. At the 2006 census, its population was 5,892, in 1,334 families. The rural district has 38 villages.

References 

Rural Districts of Kermanshah Province
Ravansar County